PBY Catalina Survivors identifies Catalinas on display, and includes aircraft designations, status, serial numbers, locations and additional information. The Consolidated PBY Catalina was a twin-engined American flying boat of the 1930s and 1940s, designed by Consolidated Aircraft Co. Several variants were built at five US and Canadian manufacturing plants.

Survivors
These complete examples of Catalinas have been preserved or restored to various levels including markings, nose art, original or representative paint schemes, and are on display at museums or at military bases, or are active aircraft potentially viewable at air events.

By default, 5-digit numeric serials known as Bureau Numbers (BuNo) are as issued by the US Navy Bureau of Aeronautics (BuAer), presented here without the imaginary "BuNo" prefix. 4-digit serials in the form 9xxx, and 5-digit serials in the form 1xxxx are as issued to Royal Canadian Air Force aircraft.

Status Codes:

D = Display
A = Airworthy
S = Stored
R = Under restoration

Notes

References
 Andrade, John. "US Military Aircraft Designations and Serials since 1909. Leicestershire UK: Midland Counties Publications. 1979. .
 Legg, David. "Consolidated PBY Catalina: The Peacetime Record". Annapolis, MD: US Naval Institute Press, 2002. .
 Ogden, Bob. "Aviation Museums and Collections of North America". UK. Air-Britain. 2007. 
 Petit, Jean-Jacques. Consolidated PBY-5A Catalina en France. 2013 – 56 p

External links
Catalina Aircraft Trust
Australian civil aircraft register
The Catalina Society (Plane Sailing) UK
The New Zealand Catalina Preservation Society

Consolidated PBY Catalinas
PB1Y survivors